Solène Rigot (born 1992) is a French actress and musician. She is mostly known for playing the lead role in the Belgian movie Puppylove.

Career 
Her first big role was in 17 Girls. Her performance was praised in the French movie . She starred in the music video "Up All Night" by Beck. She is also a member of the French musical group known as Mr. Crock.

Early life 
The French newspaper L'Express reported that she grew up in the Paris suburb of Rosny-sous-Bois. In her interview to French magazine Les Inrockuptibles, she said that she took music lessons from childhood and then she auditioned for her first film .

References

External links 
 
 

French actresses
French musicians
1992 births
Living people